North Dakota Highway 28 (ND 28) is a north–south state highway in the U.S. state of North Dakota. The southern segments southern terminus is at ND 37 south of Ryder and the northern terminus is at ND 23 north of Ryder. The northern segments southern terminus is at U.S. Route 2 (US 2) in Berthold and the northern terminus is a continuation as Saskatchewan Highway 8 at the Canada/ North Dakota border.

Major intersections

References

028
Transportation in McLean County, North Dakota
Transportation in Ward County, North Dakota
Transportation in Renville County, North Dakota